Getroud met rugby is a South African television series which premiered on kykNET on 7 April 2009. It was marketed as an Afrikaans-language version of the British television show Footballers' Wives; the title literally translates to English as Married To Rugby. The series is one of the most watched drama-series on KykNET. The series aired its last episode on the 30 of September 2022 after 7 successful seasons.

Summary
Getroud met rugby is a drama revolving around four stars of a Johannesburg rugby team and their wives as they become involved in various interconnected scandals.

Production
Getroud met Rugby was developed by Deon Opperman with his ex-wife, actress Hanli Rolfes-Opperman, who is also part of the main cast. Most of the actors on the show are well-respected Afrikaans actors. Cast members Ivan Botha and Altus Theart appeared in the film Bakgat in 2008 in which rugby was also the integral plot point.

The series was shot on location in Johannesburg and Krugersdorp on a schedule divided into two segments, the first from 29 September – 20 December 2008, and the second from March to May 2009. The crew utilized Sony EX3 High Definition cameras. Post-production was handled by The Film Factory, a post-production house in Johannesburg.

Hiatus
From the end of 2010 to March 2012 the show was on a hiatus due to the filming of the movie Getroud met Rugby: Die Onvertelde Storie. Filming resumed in March 2012.

KykNET announced on 15 October 2009, that Getroud met Rugby had been renewed for a second season.
Season 4 premiered on 17 July 2012.

Daily drama
Starting 4 April 2016 a new format (as a daily drama) was adopted, broadcast on kykNET on weekdays at 9:30 PM, in 30-minute episodes.

Cast of the soap
 Liaan Ferreira as Frank
 Stephanie Baartman as Bibi
 Jocelyn Broderick as Nina
 David Clatworthy as Gerald
 Werner Coetser as Blitz
 Christo Compion as Pottie
 Arno Greeff as Thomas
 David Louw as Simon
 Vaughn Lucas as Denver
 Jolene Martin as Jade
 Fezile Mpela as Ike
 Rina Nienaber as Koekie
 Johan Scholtz as Schalk Brand
 Elsie Slabbert as Anja
 Franci Swanepoel as Laetitia
 Altus Theart as Fafa Beltrami
 Christel van den Bergh as Renate
 Marijke van der Westhuizen as Maryke
 Ilse-Lee van Niekerk as Lorette
 Louis van Niekerk as Festus
 Sean van Noordwyk as Reitz Bekker
 Anlia van Rensburg as Sasha
 David Vlok as Gideon Bekker
 Avah Weyer as Bella
 Melissa Willering as Chrizanda

References

External links
 Official Site (MNet)
 
 http://kyknet.dstv.com/

2000s South African television series
2010s South African television series
2009 South African television series debuts
2010 South African television series endings
2012 South African television series debuts
South African drama television series
South African television soap operas
Television shows filmed in South Africa
Television shows set in Johannesburg, South Africa
Afrikaans-language television shows
KykNET original programming
Television shows set in South Africa